Mezhlauk is a Russified form of the Latvian language surname Mežlauks (from mežs – 'forest' and lauks – 'field'). Individuals with the surname include: 
 Valery Mezhlauk (1893–1938), Soviet government official
 Ivan Mezhlauk  (1891–1938), Soviet government official
  (1895–1918), Soviet government official

Russian-language surnames
Surnames of Latvian origin